Eagle Rock is an unincorporated community and census-designated place in Barry County, Missouri, United States. As of the 2020 census, it had a population of 193.

It is located on Missouri Route 86 near Table Rock Lake. Eagle Rock has a state campground and public marina.

A post office called Eagle Rock has been in operation since 1886. The community takes its name from a nearby rock formation.

The Eagle Rock Retreat Center, home of the Assembly of God youth organizations Royal Rangers National Training Center, is located approximately 4 miles southwest of Eagle Rock.

Demographics

Education
It is in the Cassville R-IV School District.

Eagle Rock has a public library, a branch of the Barry-Lawrence Regional Library.

References

External links
 Promised Land Zoo

Census-designated places in Missouri
Unincorporated communities in Barry County, Missouri
Unincorporated communities in Missouri
Census-designated places in Barry County, Missouri